The USSR women's national handball team was the national women's handball team of the Soviet Union.

Olympic Games history
 1976 :  Champions
 1980 :  Champions
 1988 :  3rd place
 1992 :  3rd place

World Championship history
 1962 : 6th place
 1973 :  3rd place
 1975 :  2nd place
 1978 :  2nd place
 1982 :  Champions
 1986 :  Champions
 1990 :  Champions

National teams of the former Soviet republics

External links

Former national handball teams
Women's national handball teams
National sports teams of the Soviet Union
National team